An information resource may refer to:

 Resource (computer science), any component of limited availability in a computer system
 Web resource, a data source accessible at the World Wide Web

See also
 Information source (disambiguation)